United Nations Security Council resolution 1139, adopted unanimously on 21 November 1997, after considering a report by the Secretary-General Kofi Annan regarding the United Nations Disengagement Observer Force (UNDOF), the Council noted its efforts to establish a durable and just peace in the Middle East.

The resolution called upon the parties concerned to immediately implement Resolution 338 (1973). It renewed the mandate of the Observer Force for another six months until 31 May 1998 and requested that the Secretary-General submit a report on the situation at the end of that period.

The Secretary-General's report said that the situation between Israel and Syria had remained calm though the situation in the Middle East as a whole continued to remain dangerous. Two UNDOF soldiers were killed by unknown assailants and Syria was carrying out an investigation.

See also
 Arab–Israeli conflict
 Golan Heights
 Israel–Syria relations
 List of United Nations Security Council Resolutions 1101 to 1200 (1997–1998)

References

External links
 
Text of the Resolution at undocs.org

 1139
 1139
 1139
1997 in Israel
1997 in Syria
November 1997 events